Aranmanai is a 2014 Indian Tamil horror comedy film co-written and directed by Sundar C. The film stars himself alongside an ensemble cast including Sundar C.,Hansika Motwani, Vinay Rai, Andrea Jeremiah, Raai Laxmi, Santhanam, Kovai Sarala, Manobala, Chitra Lakshmanan, Nithin Sathya This film was the first installment in Aranmanai film series. The film began production by the end of September 2013. and released on 19 September 2014 to mostly positive reviews from critics and grossed  at the box office and becomes a commercial success and one of the highest grossing Tamil film of the year. Due to its success, a sequel titled Aranmanai 2, with most of the cast from the first film, was released on 29 January 2016. The movie was loosely based on the 1978 movie Aayiram Jenmangal.

Plot
In a village, a group of people are led by Ayyanar in cleaning a palace whose owners plan to sell it. During the night, the cook is frightened by some supernatural being in the palace and disappears.

The next day, an estranged Eshwari returns to the village with her husband and son Muliankannan, along with her older brother and his daughter Maya. The pair, along with their late elder brother's son Murali and his new wife Madhavi, have gathered to sell their palace off to Ayyanar. Meanwhile, Paalsamy sneaks into palace under the guise of a cook, to find a photo that is the sole evidence that he is also an heir to the palace, so he can claim his share of the money.

Strange events begin to happen during their stay at the palace. Madhavi sees a servant's daughter talking to a mysterious girl called Selvi who no one else can see. The girl's mother explains that she is mentally impaired. Mishaps continue to happen, delaying the sale of the palace and the family extend their stay. Meanwhile, two other servants have also gone missing. Now Ravi, Madhavi's elder brother, comes to the palace to meet his sister. Later, Madhavi and Maya tell Ravi of the strange happenings, so Ravi sets cameras up around the palance with Maya's help.

While watching the camera feed, Ravi sees a worker backing away from something, but the camera's feed suddenly dies. At the same time, a fortune teller in front of the house runs away in terror after seeing something. The next day, the bodies of the missing servants found by the cops in a local pond. Ravi is shocked and visits the fortune teller, who reveals he witnessed a worker being killed by a woman possessed by a vengeful spirit. The fortune teller gives him an egg and tells that when the possessed person is near the egg, it will start spinning. To Ravi's horror, the egg reacts to Madhavi.

Since the little girl always speaks of a woman named Selvi, Ravi sets out to investigate. Ayyanar becomes angry when mentioned about Selvi, who stole the temple's jewels and ran away from the village. However, Selvi's friend Ramya tells Ravi that Selvi was a good person and not a thief.

A few years back, prior to his marriage, Murali came to the village and fell in love with Selvi. Selvi also liked him, but she is a girl who is often possessed by the goddess and predicts the future. Wishing to maintain her holiness, and wary of the difference in their statuses and lifestyles, she is reluctant to accept his confession. On the day Murali planned to leave the village, he asked her to meet him at the palace if she wanted to leave with him. With Ramya's encouragement, Selvi leaves to confess her love to Murali, but disappeared before reaching him.

As per Ravi's plan, Ramya comes to meet the possessed Madhavi. Selvi, recognising Ramya, tells her all that happened that day. It had been Ayyanar and his friends who had stolen and replaced the temple jewellery with fakes. When Selvi had touched one of the fakes, she received a premonition, and confronted the culprits. When they attacked her, she fled to Murali, but narrowly misses him. Ayyanar and his accomplices, the dead servants, killed and buried her inside the palace.

Selvi tells Ramya that she intends to live on with Murali in Madhavi's body. As that day is an auspicious day, if she gets intimate with Murali, no one can ever drive her out of Madhavi's body. If they cannot consummate their relationship, she will kill Murali, so that they will be together in death.

After hearing the story, Ravi meets a priest, who says there are only 2 ways to stop Selvi: use a strong emotion to bring Madhavi to her senses, or bring Murali to the river junction where a holy ritual will take place, generating a powerful energy that will lay Selvi to rest. Selvi's attempts to become intimate with Murali is being disrupted by the inhabitants of the palace, while Ravi attempts to find a way to bring Murali to the river junction without tipping off Selvi. Meanwhile, Selvi puts Murali into a trance so that she can track down and kill Ayyanar.

While she is gone, the priest and Ravi try to bring Murali out of his trance and take him to the river, but Selvi returns and attempts to stop them. The priest traps her in a circle of fire and Ravi flees with Murali. Selvi escapes and follows them, and Ravi's car overturns and falls into the river. Selvi tries to drown Murali, but Ravi tells Madhavi is pregnant and brings her to her senses briefly. At the same time, the rituation is completed, and its power finally severs Selvi's possession.

No longer possess Madhavi, Selvi disappears and Madhavi and Murali reunite. Ravi also unites with Maya in the end. And when they all pose for a photograph in front of the palace, a zoomed-in shot shows a ghostly figure moving near a window in the palace, implying that Selvi has returned to the palace.

Cast

Production
Hansika Motwani confirmed in September 2013 that she had signed the film. She also stated she played the main lead and that the story revolves around her character, which was later reported to be a lady with supernatural powers. Sundar C had initially agreed to cast Arya and Nayanthara in the sibling roles eventually played by himself and Andrea Jeremiah, but opted to make changes following the release of Raja Rani (2013), where the actors played husband and wife. Ragini Dwivedi stated that she signed up for the film, but she was later replaced by Raai Laxmi to portray another leading role. Vinay was also signed on to play a leading role in the film. Nithin Sathya tweeted that he was a part of the film too.

The filming was started on 28 September 2013 in Pollachi with Raai Laxmi, Andrea, Kovai Sarala, Nithin Sathya and Manobala. Hansika joined the team on 6 October 2013 and told "it's a super challenging role for me that I haven't done till today". The film largely takes place in a palace, for which a set created by Mohan Babu in Hyderabad was used. 2 crores were spent for renovating the palace, in which 70 per cent of the film was shot. According to Sundar C, the film stars more than one hour of computer graphics imagery.

Music

The Soundtrack was composed by Bharadwaj and Karthik Raja composed the background score.

Release

Theatrical
The film censored with an U/A certificate by the censor board, due to some strong violence scenes. The Tamil Nadu distribution rights of the film were bought by Rama Narayanan's Sri Thenaandal Films who would jointly release Aranmanai with Udhayanidhi Stalin's Red Giant Movies on 19 September 2014 across Tamil Nadu.

Home media
It was dubbed in Hindi as Raj Mahal by Goldmines Telefilms in 2015.

Reception

Critical response
Aranmanai received mostly positive reviews from critics. The Times of India wrote, "This is kitchen sink filmmaking but there is an assurance in how it is done. The film also feels somewhat overlong but the director manages to keep things moving that we just go with the flow. The visual effects are tacky and often excessive while the performances are functional...but then, the film doesn't take itself too seriously and so, we are able to overlook these niggles, and just about enjoy the ride". Deccan Chronicle gave 3 stars and called it "a film which entertains you with its Sundar's signature style of slapstick comedy combined with some scary moments". Bangalore Mirror wrote, "The horror scenes have been thoughtfully crafted and the principal cast punctuates the thrilling moments with great timing. Tactfully, he (Sundar) has had made a mirch masala from films like Chandramukhi, Arundhathi and Aayiram Jenmangal. Sify wrote, "The commercial elements comedy, horror and glamour has been mixed in the right proposition by the writer and director. What works is a riveting performance by Hansika, along with comedy track of Santhanam &Co and is packaged as a fun entertainer by Sundar C". Behindwoods.com wrote, "Sundar C is back with his typical commercial, fun filled entertainer that has all elements that will keep you engaged all the way, making you overlook those "not-too-glaring" flaws". Cinemalead.com rated 3/5 and wrote, "Aranmanai might not scare you much. Nor does it have something out of the box. But it successfully sets out doing what it intended to". Indiaglitz.com wrote, "The saying, "old wine in a new bottle", might fit Aranmanai with Sundar C's narration and screenplay helping the movie out of its predictable script".

The Hindu wrote, "What's truly scary about Aranmanai is how it brings nothing new to the horror genre...The film has a whole host of stereotypes associated with the horror genre in Tamil cinema...In many ways, Aranmanai is like a time machine. A few scenes into the film and you find yourself transported to the 80s". Rediff wrote, "Sundar C seems to have let his fans down with this cliché-ridden supernatural thriller. The narration moves at a slow pace and horror moments are practically non-existent. Even the "Aranmanai", around which the entire story revolves, is not impressive".

The producer of 1978 Tamil movie Aayiram Jenmangal, M.Muthuraman, approached City Civil court in Chennai claiming this movie to be a remake of his 1978 horror flick.The court appointed an Advocate Commissioner to verify the claims. Advocate Commissioner on viewing both the movies had stated that the plot, theme, storyline and structure were similar in both films. She also held that the script of both films were the same and most scenes were copied and replayed from Aayiram Jenmangal. The report also stated that the viewer of the film Aranmanai would definitely get the impression that the film is the remake of Aayiram Jenmangal since they had considerable similarities.

Accolades

Box office
In Chennai alone, it collected  in the first weekend. After one week the film's collection was estimated at  according to Sreedhar Pillai. Sify wrote that the film had grossed around 18 crores in two weeks at the Tamil Nadu box-office. Hindustan Times estimated the film grossed  crore in total.

Sequels

Sundar C. has directed the sequel titled Aranmanai 2, which stars Hansika Motwani with Siddharth and Trisha. Poonam Bajwa and Soori were added to the cast also Kovai Sarala, Manobala and Chitra Lakshmanan playing a supporting role.

The third sequel titled Aranmanai 3, which has an ensemble star cast including Arya, Raashi Khanna and Andrea Jeremiah, with Sakshi Agarwal, Vivek, Yogi Babu playing supporting roles.

References

External links
 

Indian comedy horror films
2014 comedy horror films
2014 films
Films directed by Sundar C.
2010s Tamil-language films
Films scored by Bharadwaj (composer)
Films shot in Hyderabad, India